Hadromeropsis is a genus of broad-nosed weevils in the beetle family Curculionidae.

There are more than 50 described species in Hadromeropsis.

Taxonomy 
Hadromeropsis was described for the first time by W. Dwight Pierce in 1913 (p. 400). The Central American species were treated by Champion. The genus was revised by Anne Howden in 1982: It contains two subgenera: Hadromeropsis (Hadromeropsis) and Hadromeropsis (Hadrorestes).

Description 
Howden offered the following diagnosis for Hadromeropsis:

Howden indicates that the most similar genus to Hadromeropsis is the South American genus Macropterus.

Distribution 
The genus Hadromeropsis has been recorded from Argentina, Bolivia, Brazil, Colombia, Ecuador, Paraguay, Peru, Uruguay, Venezuela, Costa Rica, Guatemala, Mexico, and Panama.

Species
These 53 species belong to the genus Hadromeropsis:

 Hadromeropsis alacer Howden, 1982
 Hadromeropsis amoena Howden, 1982
 Hadromeropsis annae Anderson, 2008
 Hadromeropsis apicalis Howden, 1982
 Hadromeropsis argentinensis (Hustache, 1926)
 Hadromeropsis atomaria Boheman, 1840
 Hadromeropsis aurea Boheman, 1847
 Hadromeropsis batesi Howden, 1982
 Hadromeropsis beverlyae Howden, 1982
 Hadromeropsis bombycina Howden, 1982
 Hadromeropsis brachyptera Howden, 1982
 Hadromeropsis brevicoma Howden, 1982
 Hadromeropsis cavifrons Howden, 1982
 Hadromeropsis conquisita Howden, 1982
 Hadromeropsis contracta Howden, 1982
 Hadromeropsis cretata Champion, 1911
 Hadromeropsis crinita Howden, 1982
 Hadromeropsis dejeanii Boheman, 1840
 Hadromeropsis dialeuca Howden, 1982
 Hadromeropsis earina Howden, 1982
 Hadromeropsis excubitor Howden, 1982
 Hadromeropsis exilis Howden, 1982
 Hadromeropsis fasciata Lucas, 1857
 Hadromeropsis fulgens Champion, 1911
 Hadromeropsis gemmifera Boheman, 1845
 Hadromeropsis impressicollis Kirsch, 1868
 Hadromeropsis inconscripta Howden, 1982
 Hadromeropsis institula Howden, 1982
 Hadromeropsis jugellata Howden, 1982
 Hadromeropsis magica Pascoe, 1881
 Hadromeropsis merzdiana Howden, 1982
 Hadromeropsis micans Champion, 1911
 Hadromeropsis nana Howden, 1982
 Hadromeropsis nebulicola Howden, 1982
 Hadromeropsis nitida Howden, 1982
 Hadromeropsis nobilitata Gyllenhal, 1834
 Hadromeropsis opalina (Horn, 1876)
 Hadromeropsis pallida Howden, 1982
 Hadromeropsis pectinata Howden, 1982
 Hadromeropsis picchuensis Howden, 1982
 Hadromeropsis plebeia Howden, 1982
 Hadromeropsis pulverulenta Howden, 1982
 Hadromeropsis rnandibularis Howden, 1982
 Hadromeropsis rufipes Champion, 1911
 Hadromeropsis scamba Howden, 1982
 Hadromeropsis scintillans Champion, 1911
 Hadromeropsis silacea Howden, 1982
 Hadromeropsis speculifera Howden, 1982
 Hadromeropsis spiculata Howden, 1982
 Hadromeropsis striata Howden, 1982
 Hadromeropsis superba Heller, 1921
 Hadromeropsis togata Boheman, 1840
 Hadromeropsis transandina Howden, 1982

References 

Entiminae
Articles created by Qbugbot